A popular consultation to convene a referendum on repealing the law on decriminalization of abortion was held in Uruguay on 23 June 2013. The proposal failed to muster the required popular support.

Events
In 2012, Uruguay decriminalized abortion. Many politicians and advocacy groups protested its legalization. The positions varied across the political spectrum.

Only 8.92% of eligible voters supported the referendum which did not meet the required threshold.

See also
Abortion in Uruguay

References

2013 referendums
2013 in Uruguay
Referendums in Uruguay
Cancelled referendums
Abortion in Uruguay
José Mujica